Petar Georgiev Mandzhukov (Bulgarian Петър Георгиев Манджуков and ) (July 20, 1878 – January 1, 1966) was a Macedonian Bulgarian revolutionary and anarchist, member of the Internal Macedonian-Adrianople Revolutionary Organization and of the Supreme Macedonian-Adrianople Committee.

Biography 
He was born in 1878 in the village of Mirkovci, then in the Ottoman Empire, today in North Macedonia.  Mandzhukov was a brother of the Colonel of the Bulgarian Army Spas Mandzhukov. He was a nephew is Metropolitan Nathanael of Ohrid, who lead him to Plovdiv, Eastern Rumelia, where he studied at a high school.  Mandzhukov became one of the founders of the anarchist Macedonian Secret Revolutionary Committee there and was therefore excluded from the school. He graduated later from a pedagogical school in Lom and afterwards studied chemistry at the University of Geneva, where he became a member of the anarchist Geneva group. In the autumn of 1898 he returned to Ottoman Macedonia and became a member of the IMARO. Sentenced in March 1899 to a life prison for a conspiracy, Mandzhukov appealed the verdict, and in the same year the court dismissed him for failing to prosecute. Subsequently, he entered the cheta of Gotse Delchev in 1899. In 1900 he resided in Thessaloniki where had a contact with the Gemidzii and they were influenced by his anarchist ideas, especially those relating to methods of struggle. In 1900 together with Pavel Shatev, Slavi Merdjanov and Petar Sokolov he took part in the terrorist activity around the Ottoman Bank in Istanbul.

After their arrest and release Mandzhukov emigrated to Bulgaria and became a member of the Supreme Macedonian-Adrianople Committee. In September 1901, he was head of a small detachment, and attempted to free his friend Slavi Merdzhanov from the Adrianople prison, but failed. Mandzhukov then spent some time in extortion in favor of the Supreme Committee. From the spring of 1903 Mandzhukov was the leader of a small cheta  of the Supreme Committee in the Rhodope Mountains. With the new detachment, he attempted to destroy the  railway line near Xanthi to prevent the transfer of Ottoman troops to  Thessaloniki. The vigilance of the Turkish rail guard failed this endeavor. Mandzhukov learned from the newspapers about the Thessaloniki bombings of 1903 and the deaths of the bombers themselves, among whom were his closest friends. During the Ilinden-Preobrazhenie uprising, he was the leader of a detachment in the Smolyan area. After the uprising Mandzhukov committed a murder on the order of the Supreme Committee. The target victim was a Turk, who terrorized the Bulgarian population in the region. Only four days later, a new order followed, this time for the murder of a Bulgarian. Mandzhukov then reconsidered his role in this organization, alien to his anarchist views and shorted with Supreme Committee. From the fall of 1904 he worked in Kazanlak at the afforestation service. From 1907 to 1909 he studied forestry in Nancy, France.

He participated in the Bulgarian Army during the Balkan Wars and in the First World War. Mandzhukov together with Mihail Gerdjikov was among the founders of the Federation of Anarcho-Communists in Bulgaria in 1919. After the Wars, until his retirement he worked as a forester in Kazanlak,  Karlovo, Peshtera, Razlog and elsewhere. He died in Plovdiv, Bulgaria in 1966. Mandzhukov is the author of several books devoted to the revolutionary struggles from 1895 to 1903.

Sources

1878 births
1966 deaths
Anarcho-communists
Military personnel from Plovdiv
Bulgarian revolutionaries
Members of the Internal Macedonian Revolutionary Organization
Bulgarian anarchists
Bulgarian military personnel of the Balkan Wars
Bulgarian military personnel of World War I
Macedonian Bulgarians